Khalid Butt is a Pakistani actor and director. He made his debut in 1970s and sinces then he has appeared in a huge number of Urdu and Punjabi films and television series.

Early life 

Butt born and raised in Multan, Punjab. He then moved to Lahore, Punjab in 1979 to make a career in acting. Since then, he has appeared in a number of Urdu and Punjabi television series and films. He appeared in television series such as Boota from Toba Tek Singh (1999), Landa Bazar (2002), Love, Life Aur Lahore (2011–13), Laal Ishq (2017) and GT Road (2019).

Filmography

Television

References 

Living people
Year of birth missing (living people)
Pakistani male television actors
Punjabi people